Brothers Rugby Club (formally Brothers Old Boys) is an Australian rugby union club based in Brisbane, Queensland. The name alludes to its beginnings as a rugby club founded by alumni of schools established by the Congregation of Christian Brothers.

Brothers currently competes in the Queensland Premier Rugby competition against nine of the states best Rugby Union clubs. The club was established in 1905 and has won 28 'A' Grade premierships since. They have produced 258 Queensland and 91 Internationals including 78 Wallaby players over the last century.

The club is located at Crosby Park, Albion where it has a clubhouse, two canteens and the use of two illuminated fields.

History

First golden era
The Brothers Old Boys Rugby Union Club was formed at a meeting held in 1905 by old boys of Gregory Terrace, Nudgee College and St James College who wanted a Rugby club that 'old boys' (past students) could all play for. It was further decided at this meeting to play in the school colours, blue and white hoops. These were the St Joseph's College Gregory Terrace colours of the time. In 1905, the team played in plain hoops but the Scottish supplier incorrectly sent navy and white irregular hoops ('butcher stripes') for the 1906 season and the club has maintained this jersey ever since.

In 1907, after only the second year in the Brisbane Premier Rugby competition, Brothers won their first premiership defeating Valleys 18 – 8. Brothers next string of success was titled the 'First Golden Era' when they won premierships in 1911, 1912, 1913, 1915 and 1919. During this period the club was so strong that in 1914 they fielded two teams in the competition Brothers 'A' & 'B'. The end of the 1919 season saw the demise of Rugby Union in Queensland, Rugby league became the 'code of choice' and Brisbane Premier Rugby came to a halt.

Queensland versus New South Wales interstate clash
In 1913, nine Brothers players represented Queensland in the interstate clash in Sydney and helped the team to a 22 – 21 victory. In addition to Pat Murphy and Jimmy Flynn these players were M. J. McMahon, R. McManus, Hugh Flynn, Vin. Carmichael, Tom Ryan, Bill Morrissey and Joe Russell. Another Brothers player to be selected for state and country during these years was R. 'Clinker' Birt.

Second golden era
Rugby Union was re-introduced in Queensland in 1929 and Brothers returned to the QRU in 1930, but it wouldn't be until 1945 that it tasted success. They secured their first trophy in the senior competition since the recommencement of competition with a 13 – 6 victory over University in the final of the mid-season Tom Welsby Cup in 1945. Brothers went on that year to contest the premiership final but went down to none other than arch rivals University. It was the start of a bright period for the club, a 'second golden era' saw premiership wins in 1946, 1949, 1950, 1951 and 1953.

Brothers become the first club in Brisbane to have their own ground at Crosby Park, Albion. The original arrangement began with the QRU as lease holder in 1949 but Brothers took over the lease in their own right in 1951. Prior to the move the players would train under lights at the local public New Farm Park.

The success of the late 1940s and early '50s was not repeated for more than a decade, except for a premiership win in 1959. Following the 1959 premiership win things reached possibly the lowest point ever for the club. The year 1963 saw the club struggle to field a competitive team but things began to turn around in 1964 with Premierships in 1966 and 1968.

Third golden era
The 1970s marked the start of a 'third golden era' for the club as 'A' grade premierships continued in 1971, 1973, 1974, 1975, 1978 and then an unbroken and unprecedented record of five in a row from 1980 to 1984. This gave Brothers ten premierships in a 14-year period from 1971 to 1984, a remarkable achievement. The resurgence of Brothers contributed greatly to the Queensland Rugby revival. Brothers other success in the 1980s came in 1987 when they defeated Souths 20-19.

1990s to present day
 The Premiership successes had been missing from the club since 1987, and the first and only grand final appearance in the '90s came in a loss to rivals University in the 1990 Grand Final. Brothers continued to produce quality players such as past Wallaby captain John Eales, former Queensland Reds captain and Australian Vice Captain Elton Flatley and fellow Reds players David Croft and Sean Hardman along with the recently retired Glen Panoho. In 2005, the club celebrated its Centenary and the following year after a long 16 years absence reached the Grand Final, losing 23–22 to Wests in the 2006 Grand Final. Once again in 2008, Brothers would lose another Grand Final, this time to Easts by the barest of margins falling short 21 points to Easts 22. The defeat would not last long in the memories for the club as they made back-to-back grand finals and in September 2009, after a long-awaited 22-year drought, Brothers won their 27th premiership by defeating Souths 26–19. In 2016, Brothers won their 28th premiership defeating traditional rivals University 31-28.

Rivalry with 'The Red Heavies'
The long tradition of clashes with University (nicknamed 'The Red Heavies' or 'The Students') first began in senior competition on 8 June 1912, with Brothers running out victors 24 – 0. The tradition of hard, close fought games between these two clubs remains a feature of the Brisbane club scene and there have been many memorable tussles over the years, particularly in grand finals. The most famous being the 24-all draw in 1979 that resulted in a rematch where Brothers lost 16–13 in a tight match. The latest bragging rights are with University after a 31–26 win in the 2019 final, the last time the teams have met in a grand final.

Premiership Finals results

Premiers

 1911 Brothers 21–10 Valleys

 1913 Brothers 12–0 Past Grammar
 1915 Brothers 6–0 Valleys
 1919 Brothers 20–9 University 
 1926* Brothers 6–5 Coorparoo
 1946 Brothers 11–6 GPS
 1949 Brothers 13–8 University
 1950 Brothers 21–10 University
 1951 Brothers 17–6 GPS
 1953 Brothers 11–9 University
 1959 Brothers 13–11 University
 1966 Brothers 36–9 University
 1968 Brothers 17–6 University
 1971 Brothers 17–3 Easts
 1973 Brothers 20–10 GPS
 1974 Brothers 27–19 GPS
 1975 Brothers 23–9 GPS
 1978 Brothers 19–15 University
 1980 Brothers 19–0 Souths

 1982 Brothers 25–16 University
 1983 Brothers 30–15 University
 1984 Brothers 18–3 Easts
 1987 Brothers 20–19 Souths
 2009 Brothers 26–19 Souths
 2016 Brothers 31–28 University

Grand Finalists

 1909 Valleys     19–3  Brothers
 1910 Valleys     6–0   Brothers
 1914 Past Grammar    11–8  Brothers
 1917* Valleys     13–5 Merthyr† 
 1918* Valleys     12–8  Merthyr† 

 1924* Valleys    11–8  Brothers
 1932 University  8–6   Brothers

 1941 University  23–6  Brothers
 1945 University  15–10 Brothers
 1947 University  8–6   Brothers
 1952 University  11–3  Brothers
 1960 University  11–6  Brothers
 1969 University  22–14 Brothers
 1977 Wests       15–10 Brothers
 1979‡  University  16–13 Brothers
 1986 Souths      31–13 Brothers
 1990 University  19–10 Brothers
 2006 Wests       23–22 Brothers
 2008 Easts       22–21 Brothers
 2011 Sunnybank   35–24 Brothers
 2019 University  31-26 Brothers

Notes

* Brothers played rugby league in the Brisbane premiership from 1917 to 1918 (as Merthyr) and from 1920 to 1929 (as Brothers). The rugby union competition was suspended from 1916 to 1918, and disbanded between 1920 and 1928. Brothers Old Boys started playing rugby union again in 1930. 
† Brothers played under the name Merthyr Football Club in the QRL (Metropolitan) rugby league competition from 1917–18 .  
‡  The 1979 Grand Final was replayed after a 24–24 draw.

National Club Champions
The Australian Club Championship is a challenge match between the Brisbane (Hospital Challenge Cup) and Sydney (Shute Shield) "A" Grade Premiers.

Champions

 1974 Brothers 45–22 Randwick
 1984 Brothers 25–14 Manly
 1985 Brothers 10–6 Randwick

Runners-up

 1908 Glebe  9–0   Brothers

 1982 Randwick  22–13 Brothers
 1983 Randwick  32–29  Brothers
 1988 Randwick  27–9 Brothers
 2017 Northern Suburbs  27–5 Brothers

Notes

* Brothers played rugby league in the Brisbane premiership from 1917 to 1918 (as Merthyr) and from 1920 to 1929 (as Brothers). The rugby union competition was suspended from 1916 to 1918, and disbanded between 1920 and 1928. Brothers Old Boys started playing rugby union again in 1930. 
† Brothers played under the name Merthyr Football Club in the QRL (Metropolitan) rugby league competition from 1917–18.  
§ Merthyr also played South Sydney for the "Rugby League Team Championship of Australia" at the Brisbane Cricket Ground.

International Captains
 Jimmy Flynn
 Tom Gorman
 Des Connor
 Tony Shaw
 Paul McLean
 Rod McCall
 John Eales
 Epi Bolawagatabu (Fiji)

Internationals
 John Fihelly
 Phil Carmichael
 Bob McMaster
 Kevin Bourke
 Kevin Ryan
 Bob Honan
 Barry Honan
 Chris Handy
 Mark McBain
 Ilivasi Tabua
 Elton Flatley
 Glenn Panoho
 Sam Cordingley
 Sean Hardman
 David Croft
 Dom Shipperley
 David L'Estrange
 Brendan Moon
 Alex Pope
 Dallas O'Neill
 Peter Grigg
 Ross Hanley
 Michael Freney
 Dick Cocks
 Jeff McLean
 Damien Frawley
 Michael Barry
 Peter Reilly
 Rod Kelleher
 David Dunworth
 Dominic Maguire
 Harry Roberts
 Col Forbes
 Tom Sweeney
 James O'Connor
 Taniela Tupou
 Harry Wilson
 Fraser McReight

Club Major Partners

Gouldson Legal

Ray White – Ascot

See also

 Queensland Premier Rugby
 Rugby union in Queensland

References

External links
Brothers' Old Boys' Rugby Club – Official website
Brothers Rugby Club, Sydney – Brothers Rugby Club, Sydney
St. Josephs Gregory Terrace, Brisbane – Gregory Terrace Historical Images
 St Joseph's Nudgee College Rugby History

Rugby union teams in Queensland
Sporting clubs in Brisbane
1905 establishments in Australia
Rugby clubs established in 1905